Oskar Kask (7 January 1898 Pärnu – 13 April 1942 Sosva, Russia) was an Estonian politician. He was a member of the III, IV and V Riigikogu.

Kask was the mayor of Pärnu from 1924 until 1936. From 1936 until 1940, he was Minister of Social Affairs.

Following the Soviet occupation of Estonia, Kask was arrested by the NKVD and executed by gunshot in the gulag in Sosva, Sverdlovsk Oblast in the Russian Soviet Federative Socialist Republic in 1942.

References

1898 births
1942 deaths
Estonian Labour Party politicians
National Centre Party (Estonia) politicians
Members of the Riigikogu, 1926–1929
Members of the Riigikogu, 1929–1932
Members of the Riigikogu, 1932–1934
Members of the Estonian National Assembly
Government ministers of Estonia
Mayors of Pärnu
Estonian military personnel of the Estonian War of Independence
Recipients of the Military Order of the Cross of the Eagle, Class V
Recipients of the Order of the White Star, 1st Class
University of Tartu alumni
Politicians from Pärnu
Estonian people executed by the Soviet Union
People who died in the Gulag
Members of the Riigivolikogu
People executed by the Soviet Union by firearm